Tolbukhin can refer to:

 The former name of Dobrich, a Bulgarian town
 Fyodor Tolbukhin, Soviet military commander
 Aro Tolbukhin. En la mente del asesino, a 2002 Mexican-Spanish film